Albert Ströck (12 February 1903 – 9 May 1971), also known as Adalbert Ströck and Albert Török, was a Romanian-Hungarian footballer who played for CA Oradea, Újpest FC and also for Romania and Hungary. He was part of Romania's squad for the football tournament at the 1924 Summer Olympics.

He played for Újpest FC between 1929 and 1932, winning the Mitropa Cup 1929 and the Coupe des Nations 1930. He then moved to Switzerland, to FC La Chaux-de-Fonds.

Honours
Újpest FC
 Nemzeti Bajnokság I: 1929–30, 1930–31
Hungary
 Mitropa Cup: 1929
 Coupe des Nations 1930

References

External links
 
 
 National team stats at RSSSF
 

1903 births
1971 deaths
Sportspeople from Oradea
Hungarian footballers
Romanian footballers
Hungary international footballers
Hungarian expatriate footballers
Romanian expatriate footballers
Romania international footballers
Olympic footballers of Romania
Footballers at the 1924 Summer Olympics
Stăruința Oradea players
CA Oradea players
Újpest FC players
FC La Chaux-de-Fonds players
Expatriate footballers in Switzerland
Dual internationalists (football)
Romanian people of German descent
Hungarian people of German descent
Association football forwards